Hamilton High School may refer to:

United States
Alabama
 Hamilton High School (Alabama) in Hamilton, Alabama

Arizona
 Hamilton High School (Chandler, Arizona) in Chandler, Arizona

Arkansas
 Lake Hamilton High School in Pearcy, Arkansas

California
 Hamilton High School (Anza, California) in Anza, California
 Hamilton Union High School in Hamilton City, California
 Alexander Hamilton High School in Los Angeles, California

Georgia
 Hamilton High School (Scottdale, Georgia) in Dekalb County, Georgia served African American students until desegregation in 1969

Illinois
 Hamilton High School (Hamilton, Illinois) in Hamilton, Illinois

Kansas
 Hamilton High School (Kansas) in Hamilton, Kansas

Massachusetts
 Hamilton-Wenham Regional High School in South Hamilton, Massachusetts

Michigan
 Hamilton High School (Michigan) in Hamilton, Michigan

Mississippi
 Hamilton High School (Hamilton, Mississippi) in Hamilton, Mississippi

Montana
 Hamilton High School (Montana) in Hamilton, Montana

New Jersey
In Hamilton Township, Mercer County, New Jersey:
 Hamilton High School East, also known as Steinert High School
 Hamilton High School North, also known as Nottingham High School (New Jersey)
 Hamilton High School West, also known as Hamilton High School (New Jersey)

New York
 Alexander Hamilton Jr./Sr. High School in Elmsford, New York
 Alexander Hamilton High School (Brooklyn) in Brooklyn, New York
 Fort Hamilton High School in Brooklyn, New York

Ohio
 Hamilton High School (Hamilton, Ohio) in Hamilton, Ohio
 Hamilton Catholic High School in Hamilton, Ohio
 Hamilton Township High School in Columbus, Ohio

Tennessee
 Hamilton High School (Memphis, Tennessee) in Memphis, Tennessee

Texas
 Hamilton High School (Texas) in Hamilton, Texas

Virginia
 Hamilton High School (Cartersville, Virginia) in Cartersville, Virginia

Wisconsin
 Alexander Hamilton High School (Milwaukee, Wisconsin) in Milwaukee, Wisconsin
 Hamilton High School (Sussex, Wisconsin) in Sussex, Wisconsin

It is also used as the false name of a high school in the book The World We Created at Hamilton High. According to Robert Marquand of the Christian Science Monitor, the school documented is actually Nottingham High School in Syracuse, New York.

Other countries
India
 Hamilton High School, Tamluk, West Bengal, India

New Zealand
 Hamilton High School, New Zealand, later split into two single-sex schools
 Hamilton Boys' High School in Hamilton, New Zealand
 Hamilton Girls' High School in Hamilton, New Zealand

Zimbabwe
 Hamilton High School (Bulawayo) in Bulawayo, Zimbabwe

References